Javed Rasool (born 26 March 1964) is a Pakistani sailor. He competed at the 1988 Summer Olympics and the 1992 Summer Olympics.

References

External links
 

1964 births
Living people
Pakistani male sailors (sport)
Olympic sailors of Pakistan
Sailors at the 1988 Summer Olympics – 470
Sailors at the 1992 Summer Olympics – 470
Place of birth missing (living people)
20th-century Pakistani people